The Leyenda de Plata (2004) was professional wrestling tournament produced by the Mexican wrestling promotion Consejo Mundial de Lucha Libre (CMLLl; Spanish "World Wrestling Council") that ran from July 16, 2004, over the course of three of CMLL's Friday night shows in Arena México with the finals on July 30, 2004. The annual Leyenda de Plata tournament is held in honor of lucha libre legend El Santo and is one of CMLL's most important annual tournaments.

After not holding a Leyenda de Plata tournament in 2003, it returned in 2004 with the qualifying torneo cibernetico elimination match being held on July 16, 2004. the teams were: "A", Alan Stone, Atlantis, Averno, Mephisto, Misterioso Jr., Satánico, Tarzan Boy and Virus. Team "B", Black Warrior, Perro Aguayo Jr., Emilio Charles Jr., Másacara Mágica, Místico, Negro Casas, Super Crazy and Volador Jr. The main storyline of the cibernetico was the building rivalry between Negro Casas and the recently rudo-turned Perro Aguayo Jr. Aguayo cheated to eliminate Negro Casas and along with Atlantis were the last two surviving wrestlers. On July 23, 2004 Aguayo and Atlantis wrestled in a singles match, which unlike previous years was a "best of three falls" match, that actually went to four falls before Perro Aguayo Jr. won. A week later Perro Aguayo Jr. defeated El Felino, using the victory to further the storyline with Negro Casas, Felino's brother and corner-man for the night. Following his victory Perro Aguayo Jr. broke the plaque with El Santo's mask on it, claiming that the Aguayo's were the greatest family in wrestling, refusing to accept a trophy with El Santo's name on it.

Production

Background
The Leyenda de Plata (Spanish for "the Silver Legend") is an annual lucha libre tournament scripted and promoted by the Mexican professional wrestling promotion Consejo Mundial de Lucha Libre (CMLL).  The first Leyenda de Plata was held in 1998 and was in honor of El Santo, nicknamed Enmáscarado de Plata (the Silver mask) from which the tournament got its name. The trophy given to the winner is a plaque with a metal replica of the mask that El Santo wore in both wrestling and lucha films.

The Leyenda de Plata was held annually until 2003, at which point El Santo's son, El Hijo del Santo left CMLL on bad terms. The tournament returned in 2004 and has been held on an almost annual basis since then. The original format of the tournament was the Torneo cibernetico elimination match to qualify for a semi-final. The winner of the semi-final would face the winner of the previous year's tournament in the final. Since 2005 CMLL has held two cibernetico matches and the winner of each then meet in the semi-final. In 2011, the tournament was modified to eliminate the final stage as the previous winner, Místico, did not work for CMLL at that point in time The 2004 edition of La Leyenda de Plata was the sixth overall tournament held by CMLL.

Storylines
The events featured a total of number of professional wrestling matches with different wrestlers involved in pre-existing scripted feuds, plots and storylines. Wrestlers were portrayed as either heels (referred to as rudos in Mexico, those that portray the "bad guys") or faces (técnicos in Mexico, the "good guy" characters) as they followed a series of tension-building events, which culminated in a wrestling match or series of matches.

Tournament overview

Cibernetico

Results

July 16, 2004

July 23, 2004

July 30, 2004

References

2004 in professional wrestling
Leyenda de Plata
Events in Mexico City
July 2004 events in Mexico